Wilfred Plummer (born 17 November 1957) is a Jamaican cricketer. He played in one first-class match for the Jamaican cricket team in 1978/79. Plummer was also the coach of the Canadian team at the 2010 Under-19 Cricket World Cup.

See also
 List of Jamaican representative cricketers

References

External links
 

1957 births
Living people
Jamaican cricketers
Jamaica cricketers
People from Trelawny Parish